Timothy Roe (born 28 October 1989) is a former Australian professional road cyclist.

Major results

2009
 1st Overall Jelajah Malaysia
1st Stage 7
 3rd Overall Tour de Korea
1st Stages 6 & 7
 3rd Overall Tour of Wellington
2010
 2nd Overall Thüringen Rundfahrt der U23
 6th Overall Olympia's Tour
2011
 10th Road Race, National Road Championships
2013
 1st Romsée–Stavelot–Romsée
2014
 1st Overall Tour of Gippsland
 1st Stage 2 Tour de Perth
 3rd Overall Tour of Tasmania
 8th Overall Tour de Beauce
2017
 6th Overall Tour of Japan
 8th Overall New Zealand Cycle Classic
1st Stage 1 
 9th Overall Tour de Langkawi
 10th Overall Herald Sun Tour
2018
 5th Overall Le Tour de Savoie Mont Blanc
2021
 9th Road Race, National Road Championships

References

External links

Tim Roe profile at BMC Racing Team
Cycling Shorts. BMC Team Interview Cycling Shorts. BMC Team Interview

1989 births
Living people
Australian male cyclists
Cyclists from Adelaide